The Fiat A.60 was a four-cylinder, air-cooled inline engine developed in Italy in the 1930s.

Design
The A.60 had a valve control mechanism and the distribution shaft seal, which had a special cover ensuring uniform cooling of the cylinders. In addition to the basic A.60, an A.60-R version was developed which featured a front reduction unit, self-centered, and an output of 145 hp at 2,500 rpm, or 1,580 rpm per minute for the propeller.

Variants
A.60 Standard version with direct drive, 
A.60 R. 
Geared version : output  at 2,500 engine rpm driving a 0.632:1 reduction gear.

Applications
 Fiat G.2 
 Fiat G.5
 Caproni Ca.100

Specifications

See also

References

A.60
1930s aircraft piston engines